The Royal Acadian School was a school developed for marginalized people in Halifax, Nova Scotia. The school was established by British officer and reformer Walter Bromley on 13 January 1814.  He promoted the objectives of the British and Foreign School Society in Nova Scotia, under the sponsorship of Prince Edward.   The first patron was Sir John Coape Sherbrooke.

Prior to the existence of public schools, the school offered schooling for middle-income students as well as low-income women, black students and immigrants. The school also welcomed Protestants and Catholics.  The school was controversial, however, some of its biggest supporters were Thomas McCulloch, Samuel George William Archibald, John Young, Bishop of Nova Scotia Robert Stanser, Chief Justice Brenton Halliburton and John Starr.  Hugh Bell was a vice president of the School when Henry Hezekiah Cogswell was the president.

History 
Bromley housed the Royal Acadian School in a converted building on Argyle St., Halifax that was formerly used by an amateur theatre troop.

In 1816, there were 400 students enrolled in the school.  Bromley had recruited many black students - children and adults - whom he taught on the weekends because they were employed during the week.   Some of the black students entered into business in Halifax while others were hired as servants.

In 1823, Bromley employed 67 girls and women to spin and knit native wool in his school or in their dwellings. The school ventured into this field of private enterprise to empower poor women without regard for personal profit. He paid his workers 2s. a day, which was considered a “reasonable rate” for piece-work. 

Bromley also devoted himself to the service of the Mi’kmaq people. The Mi'kmaq were among the poor of Halifax and in the rural communities. According to historian Judith Finguard, his contribution to give public exposure to the plight of the Mi’kmaq “particularly contributes to his historical significance.”  Finguard writes: 
Bromley’s attitudes towards the Indians were singularly enlightened for his day…. Bromley totally dismissed the idea that native people were naturally inferior and set out to encourage their material improvement through settlement and agriculture, their talents through education, and their pride through his own study of their languages.

Bromley’s school made a “seminal contribution” to the development of the education movement in Nova Scotia. Well after Bromley’s departure from Nova Scotia (1825), the school continued to play a central role in the campaign for free education. It became a girls’ school by the 1870s.

Notable alumni 
George Edward Fenety
Joseph Howe
Daniel Cronan

See also 
Black Nova Scotians

References 
  Walter Bromley - Canadian Biography
Endnotes

Further reading 
 Judith Fingard, “English humanitarianism and the colonial mind: Walter Bromley in Nova Scotia, 1813–25,” CHR, 54 (1973): 123–51
  Judith Fingard. Attitudes towards the Education of the Poor In Colonial Halifax, Acadiensis. Vol. II, No. 2 Spring/Printemps 197, pp. 15-42
 Judith Fingard. Anglican Design, 134-148
 Upton, Micmacs and colonists; 
Herald (Halifax), 23 Sept. 1892; 
Morning Chronicle (Halifax), 10 July 1868, 11 July 1874; 
Morning Herald (Halifax), 7, 12 Sept. 1885;
 Walter Bromley. Appeals to the People of Great Britain on behalf of the Indians of Nova Scotia
Mr. Bromley's second address, on the deplorable state of the Indians [microform : delivered in the "Royal Acadian School," at Halifax, in Nova Scotia, March 8, 1814]
 Report of the Royal Acadian School: instituted in 1813, incorporated 1840 (1851)
 Robin H. Wyllie. "The Schoolhouse in Nova Scotia: A Study of Influences on the Evolution of Schoolhouse Design in Nova Scotia, 1850-1930"; NSHR#14:2(1994); 20 pp.
Blue Pete - Royal Acadian School

Schools in Nova Scotia